Usvyaty is an urban locality (a work settlement) and the administrative center of Usvyatsky District of Pskov Oblast, Russia. It is located on the right bank of the Usvyacha River, between Lake Uzmen and Lake Usvyaty, two biggest lakes in the area. Municipally, it is incorporated as Usvyaty Urban Settlement, the only urban settlement in the district. Population:

History
The Lovat River was a part of the trade route from the Varangians to the Greeks, one of the oldest trading routes passing through Rus'. This branch of the route followed the Lovat upstream and then the Usvyacha and the Western Dvina. The area was populated since the Middle Ages, and Usvyaty (Vsvyach) was first mentioned in chronicles under 1021. The area was changing hands multiple times between Russia and Poland-Lithuania, eventually went to Poland-Lithuania and stayed there until the First Partition of Poland in 1772, when it was included into newly established Pskov Governorate, a giant administrative unit comprising what is currently Pskov Oblast and a considerable part of Belarus. After 1773, the area was split between Nevelsky and Velizhsky Uyezds of Pskov Governorate. In 1777, it was transferred to Polotsk Viceroyalty. In 1796, the viceroyalty was abolished and the area was transferred to Belarus Governorate; since 1802 to Vitebsk Governorate. Usvyaty was a center of Usvyatskaya Volost of Velizhsky Uyezd. After 1919, Vitebsk Governorate was a part of Russian Soviet Federative Socialist Republic. In 1924, Vitebsk Governorate was abolished, and Nevelsky and Velizhsky Uyezds were transferred to Pskov Governorate.

On August 1, 1927, the uyezds were abolished, and Usvyatsky District was established, with the administrative center in Usvyaty. It included parts of former Nevelsky and Velizhsky Uyezds. Pskov Governorate was abolished as well, and the district became a part of Velikiye Luki Okrug of Leningrad Oblast. On June 17, 1929, Usvyatsky District was transferred to Western Oblast. On July 23, 1930, the okrugs were also abolished and the districts were directly subordinated to the oblast. On September 27, 1937, Western Oblast was abolished, and the district was transferred to Smolensk Oblast. Between 1941 and 1944, Usvyaty was occupied by German troops. On August 22, 1944, the district was transferred to newly established Velikiye Luki Oblast. On October 2, 1957, Velikiye Luki Oblast was abolished, and Usvyatsky District was transferred to Pskov Oblast. On October 3, 1959 the district was abolished and merged into Nevelsky District. On December 30, 1966 it was re-established. On October 15, 1985 Usvyaty was granted urban-type settlement status.

Economy

Industry
In Usvyaty, there are enterprises of timber and food industry.

Transportation
The highway connecting Nevel with Smolensk via Usvyaty and Velizh bypasses Usvyaty. The whole stretch between Nevel and Velizh has been a toll road since 2002. A road connects Usvyaty with Kunya. There are also local roads.

Culture and recreation
Usvyaty contains two objects classified as cultural and historical heritage of local significance. They are an archaeological site and a tomb of soldiers fallen in World War II.

Notable people
 Algirdas (1296-1377) —  ruler of medieval Lithuania
 Matvey Obryutin — Russian voivode
 Platon Zubov (1767-1822) — Russian prince, the last of Catherine the Great's favourites
 Egor Meller-Zakomelskiy (1767-1830) - Lieutenant general of Russian army
 Pyotr Schmyakov (1872-?) - Russian politician, member of Russian State Duma
 Konstantin Kosarev (1898-1978) - officer of Soviet army, recipient of Order of Lenin
 Ierokhim Epstein (1899-1981) - Russian engineer, winner of Lenin Prize
 Fyodor Demchenko (1919-1943) - officer of Soviet army, Hero of the Soviet Union
 Viliy Karpenko (1924-1995) - officer of Soviet army, Hero of the Soviet Union
 Nikolay Kovalyov (1929-2007) - Russian worker, Hero of Socialist Labour
 Nina Kurilyonok (1934) - Russian worker, Hero of Socialist Labour

References

Notes

Sources

External links 
 

Urban-type settlements in Pskov Oblast
Velizhsky Uyezd
Vitebsk Voivodeship
Polochans